, better known by the stage name , is a Japanese actress and voice actress who works for Rush Style. She is married to fellow voice actor Show Hayami, and is the mother of the Japanese voice actor Hideyuki Hayami.

Filmography

Anime
Brave of the Legend Da Garn (1992), Sakamoto Misuzu
Macross 7 (1994), Zomd
Urotsukidoji (1995), Mizuchi
Bio Hunter (1995), Mary
Serial Experiments Lain (1998), Miho Iwakura
Record of Lodoss War: Chronicles of the Heroic Knight (1998), Karla
Tokimeki Memorial (1999), Mira Kagami
Eden's Bowy (1999), Enefia
Inuyasha (2000), Mistress Centipede
PaRappa the Rapper (2001), Teacher Hippo
Maou Dante (2002), Utsugi Tamiko
Lupin III: The Big Operation to Return The Treasures (2003), Misha
Magical Girl Lyrical Nanoha (2004), Precia Testarossa
Saiyuki Reload and Reload Gunlock (2004), Kanzeon Bosatsu
Cossette no Shozo (2004), Sakadou Zenshinni
Amatsuki (2008), Imayou
Cobra the Animation (2008), Linda Windsor
Shangri-La (2009), Ryoko Naruse
Eden of the East (2009), Kuroha Diana Shiratori (Selacao No. 11)
Tropical-Rouge! Pretty Cure (2021), The Witch of Delays
Eien no 831 (2022), Kyōko Kagami
Bleach: Sennen Kessen-Hen (2022), Izumi Ishida

Tokusatsu
Genseishin Justirisers (2004), Dr. Zora

Dubbing

Live-action
2046 (Su Li-zhen (Gong Li))
Antwone Fisher (Berta Davenport (Salli Richardson))
Before Sunset (Journalist #1 (Louise Lemoine Torres))
Belly of the Beast (Lulu (Monica Lo))
Blade (2001 TV Tokyo edition) (Dr. Karen Jenson (N'Bushe Wright))
The Bridge (Charlotte Millwright (Annabeth Gish))
Counterpart (Emily Silk  (Olivia Williams))
Cronos (Mercedes Gris (Margarita Isabel))
The Dark Knight Rises (Miranda Tate / Talia al Ghul (Marion Cotillard))
Daybreakers (Audrey Bennett (Claudia Karvan))
Fading Gigolo (Dr. Parker (Sharon Stone))
Fatherhood (Marion (Alfre Woodard))
Firewall (2009 TV Asahi edition) (Beth Stanfield (Virginia Madsen))
Forsaken (Mary Alice Watson (Demi Moore))
The Gift (Linda (Kim Dickens))
Hannah Montana: The Movie (Vita (Vanessa Williams))
Inception (Mal Cobb (Marion Cotillard))
Keeping the Faith (Anna Reilly (Jenna Elfman))
The Midnight After (Mook Sau-ying (Kara Wai))
Nurse Jackie (Eleanor O'Hara (Eve Best))
The Royal Tenenbaums (Margot Helen Tenenbaum (Gwyneth Paltrow))
The Sorcerer's Apprentice (Veronica Gorloisen (Monica Bellucci))
Spectre (Lucia Sciarra (Monica Bellucci))
Strike Back (Eleanor Grant (Amanda Mealing))
Wasabi (Sofia (Carole Bouquet))

Animation
Steven Universe (Rose Quartz)

References

External links
Official agency profile 
Rei Igarashi at Ryu's Seiyuu Infos

1963 births
Living people
Japanese video game actresses
Japanese voice actresses
People from Fuchū, Tokyo
Voice actresses from Tokyo Metropolis